Maksym Volodymyrovych Yarovyi (born 3 October 1989) is a Ukrainian cross-country skier, biathlete, and Paralympian. He competes in classification category sitting events.

Early life 
Maksym Yarovyi was born on October 3, 1989. His disability came from an accident. He began competing in 1997.

Career 
He was awarded Master of Sports of Ukraine in winter sports for persons with disabilities. He earned a bronze medal in the long biathlon in Vuokatti, Finland. At competitions in Vuokatti in January 2014 he won first place in cross-country skiing (short distance) and second in cross-country skiing (middle distance). At the Winter Paralympics in Sochi he won the silver medal in biathlon, as well as silver and bronze medals in ski racing. He participated at the 2022 Winter Paralympics.

References

External links
 

1989 births
Living people
Ukrainian male cross-country skiers
Ukrainian male biathletes
Paralympic biathletes of Ukraine
Paralympic cross-country skiers of Ukraine
Biathletes at the 2014 Winter Paralympics
Biathletes at the 2018 Winter Paralympics
Biathletes at the 2022 Winter Paralympics
Cross-country skiers at the 2014 Winter Paralympics
Cross-country skiers at the 2018 Winter Paralympics
Medalists at the 2014 Winter Paralympics
Medalists at the 2018 Winter Paralympics
Paralympic gold medalists for Ukraine
Paralympic silver medalists for Ukraine
Paralympic bronze medalists for Ukraine
Paralympic medalists in cross-country skiing
Paralympic medalists in biathlon